The Mindanao miniature babbler (Micromacronus sordidus) is a bird species in the family Cisticolidae. It was formerly included in M. leytensis as a subspecies, is now usually held to be a distinct species, M. sordidus.

M. sordidus is endemic to the Philippines. Its natural habitats are subtropical or tropical moist lowland forests and subtropical or tropical moist montane forests. Its status is insufficiently known.

References

 Collar, N.J. & Robson, C. (2007): Family Timaliidae (Babblers). In: del Hoyo, Josep; Elliott, Andrew & Christie, D.A. (eds.): Handbook of Birds of the World, Volume 12 (Picathartes to Tits and Chickadees): 70-291. Lynx Edicions, Barcelona.

Mindanao miniature babbler
Birds of Mindanao
Mindanao miniature babbler